Thomas Ainslie was a Scotland international rugby union football player.

Rugby Union career

Amateur career

He played for Edinburgh Institution F.P.

Provincial career

He played for Edinburgh District in the 1879 and 1880 inter-city.

He played for East of Scotland District in the March 1879 and January 1880 match.

International career

Administrative career

Ainslie became the 19th President of the Scottish Rugby Union. He served the 1891–92 term in office.

Family

He was the brother of Robert Ainslie who was also capped for Scotland.

References

Sources

 Bath, Richard (ed.) The Scotland Rugby Miscellany (Vision Sports Publishing Ltd, 2007 )

1860 births
1926 deaths
East of Scotland District players
Edinburgh District (rugby union) players
Edinburgh Institution F.P. players
Presidents of the Scottish Rugby Union
Rugby union players from Midlothian
Scotland international rugby union players
Scottish rugby union players
Rugby union forwards